Zip Industries is a privately owned Australian business founded by Michael Crouch AC. It manufactures and markets instant boiling water systems. These are sold in more than seventy countries, where they are specified for use in kitchens, hospitals, universities, schools, and homes.

Since 1970, Zip has pioneered under-bench instant boiling water systems and since 1996, has marketed under-sink systems that dispenses boiling filtered water, instant chilled filtered water, and also instant chilled sparkling water

Headquartered in Sydney, Zip has several Australian customer service offices around Australia, with a network of more than 300 trained service technicians.

In the United Kingdom, Zip has customer service offices in London, Birmingham, Manchester and Dereham, warehousing in Dereham and a manufacturing facility at Southport, Merseyside. In New Zealand, Zip trades as Zenith Heaters, with a customer service office in Auckland. Zip distributors are located in Europe (Germany), South Africa, mainland China, Hong Kong, Singapore, Philippines, Cyprus, PNG, Taiwan and Thailand.

Early history 
Prior to 1962, Zip focused mainly on boiling water heaters for kitchens and then hot water heaters for bathrooms, which it manufactured and marketed in Australia from about 1947.  An early Zip innovation was a manually operated over-sink boiling water heater with a "ready whistle" and automatic cut-off, which became a popular fixture in Australian restaurants and community kitchens during the 1950s and 1960s. The company was acquired by Crouch in 1962.

Product development 
During the 1960s, Zip expanded its range of over-sink boiling water heaters catering for canteen, restaurant, factory and office kitchens needing high volumes of boiling water. Larger capacity boiling water heaters were also manufactured for use in dairies.

By 1970, Zip also installed the world's first "boiling water tap" – a boiling water tap installed beside standard hot and cold taps.

By 1975, Zip added its first on-wall instant boiling water heaters with enhanced energy efficiency and an increased capacity measured in number of cups of boiling water per hour. Zip then also created the Zip Miniboil, the first small on-wall instant boiling water heater. The Zip Miniboil was followed closely by the Zip Tea Tap, an under-sink, non-pressurized instant boiling water system. It delivered water within one degree of boiling point, with little or no steam or splatter. The Zip Tea Tap originated a patented steam condensing system to eliminate the emission of excessive steam in conjunction with boiling water. By 1985, Zip Tea Tap was so well accepted in Australia that it was specified for all of the kitchens and Members' offices in the new Parliament House, Canberra.

In the early 1990s, Zip introduced a range of advanced on-wall instant boiling water heaters under the Zip Hydroboil brand. These were far more compact, energy-efficient and easier to service than any existing equivalents.

By 1996, Zip introduced air-cooled Zip HydroTap under-bench filtered instant boiling water systems which also dispensed filtered chilled drinking water from a single touch-button electronic tap. By 2004, the initial Zip HydroTap was superseded by re-designed product engineering and a distinctive lever-action electronic tap offering precise water flow control, safety, and power-saving features, plus a "font" accessory which enabled the tap to be positioned away from any sink, with independent drainage. Zip HydroTap models introduced in 2012 provide sparkling chilled and filtered drinking water (in addition to boiling and chilled) from one tap. The Zip HydroTap All-In-One launched in 2012, gives boiling, chilled and sparkling filtered water plus hot and cold water.

Global expansion 

Zip manufacturing facilities and head office are located in Sydney, Australia, and Australian made Zip products are now marketed in more than seventy countries. Distributors throughout the South-East Asia were first established in 1982 and 1983. A distributor for Great Britain was engaged in 1987, and instant boiling water systems were exhibited for the first time in Europe when Zip first participated in Europe's Domotechnika and ISH trade shows in 1989 and 1991.

In 1991, Zip Heaters (UK) Limited was formed to take over UK distribution, and a distributor for Europe, based in Germany, was appointed in 2002. More recently, distributors were appointed in China and a Zip company, Zenith Heaters, became responsible for distribution in New Zealand.

Business development 

In addition to its Australian-made range of instant boiling water products, Zip Industries also markets:
	water chillers and filtered drinking water systems under the Zip brand
	catering industry boiling water products (including portable electric urns) under the Birko brand
	retail “food service” boiling and chilled water systems under the Instanta brand
	electronically controlled “point of use” instant hot water systems under the Zip brand

A range of Zip touch-free washroom products includes: touch-free sensor taps for hand-basins, thermostatic mixing valves for delivery of temperature-controlled water for hand-basins, baths, showers, touch-free automatic hand dryers, and touch-free flushing systems for pan toilets and urinals.

Community involvement 

Zip Industries was Principal Sponsor for three years (2011, 2012, 2013) of the Sydney Festival, the Southern Hemisphere's largest annual international arts festival involving musical, dance and theatrical performances staged at many locations in and around Sydney. 

Zip Industries has been a Principal Sponsor since 2009 of the Duke of Edinburgh's Award in Australia, which attracts participation on the part of more than 30,000 young Australians each year. Zip founder, Michael Crouch, served on the National Board of the Duke of Edinburgh Award in Australia, and was Vice-President of the Friends of the Duke of Edinburgh's Award in Australia from 2012 until his death in February 2018. The Duke of Edinburgh presented him with the Duke of Edinburgh's Pin as a World Fellow of the Award, at a ceremony in Canberra in October 2012. In addition, he serves as a board member of The Queen Elizabeth Diamond Jubilee Trust in Australia, and is Chairman of The Friends of the Royal Flying Doctor Service of Australia.

Zip Industries has been a long-term supporter of Symphony of Australia Pty Ltd, an organization devoted to the establishment of a treasury of Australian cultural history in music and song, in conjunction with the Sydney musician, singer and composer Gavin Lockley.

Zip has acted as principal sponsor of a number of major events staged by Symphony of Australia, including the first free orchestral concert ever staged in The Domain, Sydney, to celebrate Australia Day 2010, and an orchestral concert at the Sydney Opera House to celebrate the 85th birthday of The Royal Flying Doctor Service of Australia in 2012.

Zip also lends support each year to the National Biography Award of Australia, administered by the State Library of New South Wales. Zip founder Michael Crouch and the Award founder, Dr Geoffrey Cains, were joint benefactors.

References 

Hearn, Marg: “Is Australian Manufacturing at Breaking Point?” Design Quarterly Magazine, Spring 2013.
Cleary, Paul: “Zip taps a burning desire to be different” The Australian, 26 January 2013.
Layton, Prof R. A. (editor) “Major Award, Zip Heaters (Aust.) Pty. Ltd., Marketing Against a Myth” Australian Marketing Projects, Report of Entries, Hoover Award for Marketing 1967, Halstead Press.

Specific

External links 

Sydney Festival
The Duke of Edinburgh’s Award in Australia
Friends of the Royal Flying Doctor Service of Australia
Symphony of Australia
National Biography Award of Australia

Drinking water
Australian brands
Privately held companies of Australia
Manufacturing companies of Australia